Jason Carroll may refer to:

 Jason Carroll (journalist), American journalist
 Jason Carroll (researcher), British cancer researcher
 Jason Michael Carroll (born 1978), American country music artist